The Chandrayaan programme, also known as the Indian Lunar Exploration Programme is an ongoing series of outer space missions by the Indian Space Research Organisation (ISRO). The programme incorporates lunar orbiter, impactor, soft lander and rover spacecraft. The name of the programme is from Sanskrit .

Programme structure

The Chandrayaan (Indian Lunar Exploration Programme) programme is a multiple mission programme. , one orbiter with an impactor probe has been sent to the Moon, using ISRO's workhorse PSLV rocket. The second spacecraft consisting of orbiter, soft lander and rover was launched on 22 July 2019, by using a GSLV Mk III rocket. In a podcast from AT, VSSC director S. Somanath stated that there will be a Chandrayaan-3 and more follow up missions in Chandrayaan Program. The Chandrayaan-3 mission is expected to launch in 2023.

Phase I: Orbiter and Impactor
Chandrayaan-1

Prime Minister Atal Bihari Vajpayee announced the Chandrayaan project on course in his Independence Day speech on 15 August 2003. The mission was a major boost to India's space program. The idea of an Indian scientific mission to the Moon was first mooted in 1999 during a meeting of the Indian Academy of Sciences. The Astronautical Society of India carried forward the idea in 2000. Soon after, the Indian Space Research Organisation (ISRO) set up the National Lunar Mission Task Force which concluded that ISRO has the technical expertise to carry out an Indian mission to the Moon. In April 2003 over 100 eminent Indian scientists in the fields of planetary and space sciences, Earth sciences, physics, chemistry, astronomy, astrophysics and engineering and communication sciences discussed and approved the Task Force recommendation to launch an Indian probe to the Moon. Six months later, in November, the Indian government gave the nod for the mission.

The first phase includes the launch of the first lunar orbiters.

Chandrayaan-1, launched on 22 October 2008 aboard a PSLV-XL rocket, was a big success for ISRO as the Moon Impact Probe, a payload on board the Chandrayaan-1 spacecraft, discovered water on the Moon. Apart from discovering water the Chandrayaan-1 mission performed several other tasks such as mapping and atmospheric profiling of the Moon.

Phase II: Soft landers and rovers

Chandrayaan-2
On 18 September 2008, the First Manmohan Singh Cabinet approved the mission. Although ISRO finalised the payload for Chandrayaan-2 per schedule, the mission was postponed in January 2013 and rescheduled to 2016 because Russia was unable to develop the lander on time. Roscosmos later withdrew in wake of the failure of the Fobos-Grunt mission to Mars, since the technical aspects connected with the Fobos-Grunt mission were also used in the lunar projects, which needed to be reviewed. When Russia cited its inability to provide the lander even by 2015, India decided to develop the lunar mission independently and unused orbiter hardware was repurposed to be used for Mars Orbiter Mission.

Chandrayaan-2 was launched on 22 July 2019 aboard a  GSLV Mk III rocket. The spacecraft was successfully put into lunar orbit on August 20, 2019  but the lander was lost while attempting to land on 6 September 2019. The orbiter is operational, collecting scientific data, and is expected to function for 7.5 years.

Chandrayaan-3

In November 2019, ISRO officials stated that a new lunar lander mission was being studied for launch in November 2020. This new proposal is called Chandrayaan-3 and it would be a re-attempt to demonstrate the landing capabilities needed for the Lunar Polar Exploration Mission proposed in partnership with Japan for 2024. This spacecraft configuration would not include launching an orbiter and would have a lander, rover, and a propulsion module, behaving like a communications relay satellite, with mission costing  250 crore with additional launch costs of  365 crore for GSLV Mk III. This third mission would land in the same area as the second one. As of April 2022, Chandrayaan-3 is expected to launch in 2023.

Phase III: On site sampling
Lunar Polar Exploration Mission
The next mission will be the Lunar Polar Exploration Mission or Chandryaan-4, suggested to be launched in 2025. India is collaborating with Japan in this mission but the mission is not yet defined. It will be a lander-rover mission near lunar pole to perform on site sampling and analysis of collected lunar material and demonstrate lunar night survival technologies.

Chandryaan-5
The mission has been suggested for time frame of 2025-30. It will include a lander based rotary-percussive drilling in lunar soil upto a depth of 1~1.5 meters and analysis of cut using instruments. A volcanically and tectonically active area on near side of the moon will be selected for experiment.

Phase IV: Sample-return missions
Chandryaan-6
The mission has been suggested for time frame of 2030-35. It will include drilling of lunar soil followed and return samples to earth.

See also

References

Missions to the Moon
Indian lunar exploration programme
ISRO programs
2008 establishments in India